, also called , Nomijima, Nomi Island, or  is an island in Hiroshima Bay located in southwestern Hiroshima Prefecture, Japan. The mess with island name originates from the ancient (and possibly legendary) strait at now town .

Geography
The island is roughly Y-shaped, with the former Nōmi occupying center, the Okimi - north-western branch, Etajima - north-eastern branch, and Ōgaki - the southern branch.

Transportation
Since 1973, the island is connected to the Japanese mainland of Honshu by the  bridge passing through the Kurahashi-jima island. The island is served by the national route 487. Also, ferries are available from the cities of Hiroshima and Kure on Honshu island and Matsuyama on Shikoku island.

History
The Imperial Japanese Naval Academy was moved to Etajima Island in 1888. While the academy still exists under the name Naval Academy Etajima, modern Etajima focuses rather on olive cultivation and fish hatcheries in Etajima Bay north of the island.

Further reading
 Cecil Bullock, Etajima: the Dartmouth of Japan (London, 1942)

See also
 Kure Naval District

References

Islands of Hiroshima Prefecture
Geiyo Islands